Harry Binswanger (born 1944) is an American philosopher. He is an Objectivist and a board member of the Ayn Rand Institute. He was an associate of Ayn Rand, working with her on The Ayn Rand Lexicon and helping her edit the second edition of Rand's Introduction to Objectivist Epistemology. He is the author of How We Know: Epistemology on an Objectivist Foundation (2014).

Biography
Harry Binswanger was born and raised in Richmond, Virginia. He is an heir to the Binswanger Glass Company, founded in 1872 by Samuel Binswanger.

In 1965, Binswanger received his Bachelor of Science in Humanities and Engineering from the Massachusetts Institute of Technology, where he was a brother of Zeta Beta Tau fraternity. In 1973, he earned his Doctor of Philosophy in Philosophy from Columbia University. His dissertation was in the philosophy of biology and presented a theory of the goal-directedness of living action. It was published in 1990 as The Biological Basis of Teleological Concepts. He has since taught philosophy at several universities, including the City University of New York, The New School, and the University of Texas at Austin.

Binswanger was a friend of Ayn Rand in the final years of her life and has written his subsequent philosophical work in the tradition of Rand's Objectivist philosophy. From 1980 through 1987, he published and edited a bimonthly journal called The Objectivist Forum, which was later published as a hardback collection. He edited the new material in the second edition of Rand's book, Introduction to Objectivist Epistemology, published in 1990 after her death. He also compiled The Ayn Rand Lexicon, a compilation of Rand's views on various topics. His book, How We Know: Epistemology on an Objectivist Foundation, was published in 2014.

Binswanger is on the board of directors of the Ayn Rand Institute and is listed as a scholar at the Ayn Rand Institute Campus. He also moderates and posts to a fee-based online discussion group on Objectivism, called "The Harry Binswanger Letter", which he has operated since 1998. Binswanger was previously a contributor to Forbes and is currently a contributor to RealClearMarkets. His television appearances have included Glenn Beck and Geraldo at Large. He also appears in Ayn Rand: A Sense of Life, the Academy Award-nominated documentary by Michael Paxton, and Ayn Rand & the Prophecy of Atlas Shrugged, a 2011 documentary by Chris Mortensen.

Views
Binswanger has been described as an "orthodox" Objectivist who is committed to ideas of his mentor Rand, whom he considers a "once in a millennium genius". Binswanger expressed support for Israel on Glenn Beck and denied global warming in his Forbes column of April 3, 2013. He calls for "absolutely open immigration" in a post on his website.

In 1986, Binswanger and John Ridpath participated in a debate on Socialism vs Capitalism against John Judis and Christopher Hitchens. In this debate he argued for the merits of capitalism as compared to socialism from an Objectivist perspective. During the debate, Binswanger stated "Colonialism is the best thing that ever happened to the colonies," and "We view the colonialization of India and the rest of the world [...] as the extending of wealth and civilization to backward regions."

Works

As author

As editor
 The Objectivist Forum. Vols 1–8, 1980–1987.

Notes

References

External links
 The Harry Binswanger Letter

20th-century American philosophers
21st-century American philosophers
Atheist philosophers
American atheism activists
Objectivists
Objectivism scholars
Massachusetts Institute of Technology alumni
Columbia Graduate School of Arts and Sciences alumni
Hunter College faculty
University of Texas at Austin faculty
People from Richmond, Virginia
1944 births
Living people
Action theorists
Philosophers from Texas
20th-century atheists
21st-century atheists
Ayn Rand Institute